Abraham is a patriarch in the Biblical Book of Genesis and the Quran.

Abraham most commonly also refers to:
 Abraham Lincoln, U.S. President.

Abraham may also refer to:

People
 Abraham (given name), persons with the given name Abraham
 Abraham (surname), persons with the surname Abraham
 Armistead Abraham Lilly (1878-1956), American lawyer, businessman, and politician

Places

United States
 Abraham, Utah, a community
 Mount Abraham (Maine)
 Mount Abraham (Vermont)

Canada
 Abraham Mountain, Alberta
 Abraham Lake, Alberta

Other uses
 Abraham Catalogue of Belgian Newspapers, an online catalogue of Belgian historical newspapers
 Abraham (1993 film), a television movie based on the life of the Biblical patriarch Abraham
 Abraham (2015 film), a film directed by Jans Rautenbach
 Abraham (album), a 2018 album by Iranian singer Mohsen Chavoshi
Abraham, a 2002 book by Bruce Feiler
 Abraham (aircraft manufacturer), active in the 1930s
Abraham Accords, diplomatic agreements between the US, Israel, Bahrain, and the United Arab Emirates

See also 
 Abrahamson, a surname
 Abram (name)
 Avraham (given name)
 Avraham (surname)
 Avram (given name)
 Avram (surname)
 Ibrahim (name)
 Avraham (disambiguation)
 Ibrahim (disambiguation)